Filip Grgić (born 25 October 1989) is a taekwondo practitioner from Croatia.

Grgić won the gold medal in the men's bantamweight (under 62  kg) class at the 2007 World Taekwondo Championships. He was named the best Croatian sportsmen for 2007 handed out by the Croatian Olympic Committee, along with handballer Ivano Balić.

He won silver at the 2012 European championships in Manchester, United Kingdom, in the Male, Senior, -68  kg category.

References

Profile from The-Sports.org

Croatian male taekwondo practitioners
1989 births
Living people
Taekwondo practitioners at the 2015 European Games
European Games competitors for Croatia
Olympic taekwondo practitioners of Croatia
Taekwondo practitioners at the 2016 Summer Olympics
European Taekwondo Championships medalists
World Taekwondo Championships medalists
21st-century Croatian people